Events from the year 1976 in Sweden

Incumbents
 Monarch – Carl XVI Gustaf 
 Prime Minister – Olof Palme, Thorbjörn Fälldin

Events
19 June – King Carl XVI Gustaf marries Silvia Sommerlath.
19 September – The 1976 Swedish general election is held.
14 October – Following a defeat for the Social Democratic Party of Sweden in the Swedish parliamentary election, Olof Palme resigns as Prime Minister of Sweden and is replaced with Thorbjörn Fälldin.

Popular culture

Sports
 23–28 February – The Winter Paralympics are held in Örnsköldsvik.
 2–7 March – The 1976 World Figure Skating Championships are held in Gothenburg.

Music
 11 October – The ABBA album Arrival released.
 Livets teater by Magnus Uggla released.

Births

 16 April – Robert Dahlqvist, Swedish singer-songwriter and guitarist (died 2016)
 25 May – Stefan Holm, Swedish high jumper.
 10 June – Patrik Kittel, horse rider.
 25 August – Alexander Skarsgård, actor

Date unknown
 Henrik Åberg, Swedish singer.
 Gunnar Domeij, former floorball player.

Deaths
 28 July – Karin Kock-Lindberg, politician (born 1891).
 21 December – Karin Ekelund, Swedish actress (born 1913)

References

 
Years of the 20th century in Sweden